The Henschel Hs 122 was a German army cooperation/reconnaissance aircraft of the mid-1930s, radial-engined and with a parasol wing. Though only pre-production variants entered service, the Hs 122 led on to the Hs 126 which was produced in large numbers.

Development
The Hs 122 was the Henschel company's second aircraft, its first, the Hs 121 not being intended for production. It was designed in response to a Reich Air Ministry call for a multi-role army co-operation aircraft to replace the ageing Heinkel He 46.

The design emerged as a single-engine two-seat parasol wing machine with a fixed undercarriage. The wing centre section was carried above the fuselage on a series of short struts and the swept outer sections were braced to the lower fuselage with V struts. The wings were built around two metal spars and had metal-covered leading edges and upper surfaces with fabric elsewhere. The fuselage was an elliptical metal monocoque, with a metal-structured tail also metal covered apart from fabric control surfaces. The tailplane was mounted about halfway up the fin, supported by a parallel pair of struts. The spatted mainwheels were each mounted on V struts to the fuselage. The cockpits were open, with the pilot sitting below a cut-out in the wing trailing edge and the second crew member in a separate cockpit aft.

The first prototype, registered D-UBYN, was powered, like several other German aircraft of the time including the Messerschmitt Bf 109, by a Rolls-Royce Kestrel V-12-cylinder water-cooled engine; but the next prototype (D-UBAV) had a 460 kW (610 hp) Siemens Sh 22B 9-cylinder supercharged radial.

There were at least three prototypes, followed by a small number of pre-production Siemens-powered Hs 122B-0 aircraft which entered service in 1936. These were followed on the Henschel production lines at Schönefeld by the more powerful Hs 126.

Specifications (Hs 122 B-0)

References

Citations

Cited sources

Hs 122
1930s German military reconnaissance aircraft
Parasol-wing aircraft
Single-engined tractor aircraft
Aircraft first flown in 1935